Neorealism may refer to:
 Neorealism (art)
 Italian neorealism (film)
 Indian neorealism or parallel cinema
 Neorealism (international relations)
 New realism (philosophy)

See also
 Realism (disambiguation)